Uranium is a chemical element with symbol U and atomic number 92.

Uranium may also refer to:

Chemistry
 Isotopes of uranium
 Uranium-232
 Uranium-233
 Uranium-234
 Uranium-235
 Uranium-236
 Uranium-238
 Uranium-239
 Uranium-240

Places
 Uranium (Caria), a town of ancient Caria, now in Turkey
 Uranium City, Saskatchewan, a Canadian settlement

Arts
 Uranium (album), 2015 album by Danish dancehall band Bikstok

See also

List of uranium mines
 U (disambiguation)